The 1989 Asian Women's Volleyball Championship was the fifth edition of the Asian Championship, a biennial international volleyball tournament organised by the Asian Volleyball Confederation (AVC) with Volleyball Association of Hong Kong, China (VBAHK). The tournament was held in British Hong Kong from 30 September to 8 October 1989.

Preliminary round

Pool A

|}

|}

Pool B

|}

|}

Final round

Classification 9th–10th

|}

Classification 5th–8th

|}

|}

Championship

|}

|}

Final standing

References
Results (Archived 2009-05-08)

International volleyball competitions hosted by Hong Kong
A
Asian women's volleyball championships
1989 in Hong Kong sport